Museum Ovartaci in Aarhus, Denmark is a combined art and historical museum dedicated to the history of psychiatric treatment and art produced by patients at the Risskov Psychiatric Hospital. It was a  part of Aarhus University Hospital  in the same buildings as the Psychiatric Hospital in Risskov, but now it is located on Katrinebjergvej in Aarhus N. The museum also offers social programmes directed at psychiatric patients, including an open atelier, creative workshops and a café.

The hospital opened in 1852 under the name “Jydske Asyl” in buildings designed by Michael Gottlieb Bindesbøll. The art museum is on the ground floor of the building and holds a collection 12.000 works by psychiatric patients of which 850 are on display. Central to the exhibition is works by the painter and sculptor Louis Marcussen, also known as Ovartaci, who was a patient in the hospital for 56 years, from 1929 until her death in 1985, and after whom the museum is named.

The psychiatric history museum resides on the first floor and features furniture and equipment used since the museum opened in 1852. In the early years, treatment at the hospital was divided into social classes with considerably more comfortable amenities for the upper classes, illustrated with exhibitions of the recreational facilities available to the different patient classes.  Tools and workshops from the 19th century is in display, including a printing press, sowing room and woodworkings shop. The history of psychiatric treatment is illustrated with the tools used through the years, from lobotomy to electric shock therapy, and large placards detailing developments in psychiatric medicine and treatment.

References

External links 

Museum Ovartaci

Museums in Aarhus
Aarhus N